Fysh is a surname. Notable people with the surname include:

Philip Fysh (1835–1919), an Australian politician
Hudson Fysh (1895–1974), an Australian aviator and businessman
Marcus Fysh (born 1970), a British politician
Carl Fysh, a member of British boy band Brother Beyond

See also
Fish (surname)
Fisch (surname)

Surnames from nicknames